The "Sussex Carol" is a Christmas carol popular in Britain, sometimes referred to by its first line "On Christmas night all Christians sing". Its words were first published by Luke Wadding, a 17th-century Irish bishop, in a work called Small Garland of Pious and Godly Songs (1684). It is unclear whether Wadding wrote the song or was recording an earlier composition.

Both the text and the tune to which it is now sung were discovered and written down by Cecil Sharp in Buckland, Gloucestershire, and Ralph Vaughan Williams, who heard it being sung by a Harriet Verrall of Monk's Gate, near Horsham, Sussex (hence "Sussex Carol"). The tune to which it is generally sung today is the one Vaughan Williams took down from Mrs. Verrall and published in 1919.

An earlier version using a different tune and a variation on the first line, "On Christmas night true Christians sing", was published as early as 1878 in Henry Ramsden Bramley and John Stainer's Christmas Carols New and Old. The carol has been arranged by a number of composers. Vaughan Williams' setting is found in his Eight Traditional English Carols. Several years earlier, Vaughan Williams had included the carol in his Fantasia on Christmas Carols, first performed at the 1912 Three Choirs Festival at Hereford Cathedral. Erik Routley's arrangement in the 1961 University Carol Book adds a modal inflection to the setting. The carol often appears at the King's College "Festival of Nine Lessons and Carols", where it is performed in arrangements by either David Willcocks or Philip Ledger, both former directors of music at the chapel. Willcocks's arrangement appears in the first OUP Carols for Choirs.

Text
A number of variations on the text exist, although all feature the repetition of the first two stanzas. Below is a comparison between the text collected by Cecil Sharp in Gloucestershire, that of Ralph Vaughan Williams in Sussex (the version used in his Fantasia and both the David Willcocks and Philip Ledger arrangements). The version printed by Bramley and Stainer in 1878 is closer to the earliest known version by Luke Wadding from 1684, but it is clear that the original does not fit the modern tune.

See also
Music of Sussex
List of Christmas carols

References

External links

 "Sussex Carol" (arr. Vaughan Williams) sung by the Choir of King's College, Cambridge

Christmas carols
English folk songs
17th-century hymns
Music in Sussex
Songwriter unknown